CCFR may refer to:

 Canadian Coalition for Firearm Rights, a Canadian gun-rights organization
 Capital City Fire/Rescue, the provider of fire and emergency services in Juneau, Alaska